XHPS-FM is a radio station on 93.3 FM in Veracruz, Veracruz, Mexico. It is owned by MVS Radio and carries its Exa FM pop format.

History
XHPS received its concession on November 9, 1977. It was owned by Alberto Pérez Alfaro. In 1986, an MVS concessionaire bought the station.

References

Radio stations in Veracruz
Radio stations established in 1977
MVS Radio